Port of Gdynia is a Polish seaport located on the western shore of Gdańsk Bay, Baltic Sea, in Gdynia. Founded in 1926, in 2008 it ranked second in intermodal containers on the Baltic Sea. The port adjoins Gdynia Naval Base, with which it shares waterways, but is administratively a separate entity.

Trans-shipments 
1924: 10,000 tons
1929: 2,923,000 tons
1938: 8,700,000 tons
1990: 9,987,000 tons
1995: 7,739,000 tons
2000: 8,397,000 tons
2002: 9,349,000 tons
2003: 9,797,000 tons
2004: 10,711,000 tons
2005: 11,038,000 tons
2006: 12,218,000 tons
2007: 14,849,000 tons
2008: 12,860,000 tons
2009: 11,361,000 tons
2010: 12,346,000 tons
2011: 12,992,000 tons
2012: 13,187,000 tons
2013: 15,051,000 tons
2014: 16,961,000 tons
2015: 15,521,000 tons
2016: 19,536,000 tons
2017: 21,225,000 tons
2018: 23,500,000 tons

See also
 Gdynia Shipyard

References

External links

 
 AIS live vessel traffic in Port of Gdynia

Gdynia
Ports and harbours of Poland
Geography of Pomeranian Voivodeship